Smith's leaf-toed gecko (Hemidactylus smithi) is a species of lizard in the family Gekkonidae. The species is endemic to the Horn of Africa.

Etymology
The specific name, smithi, is in honor of American physician Arthur Donaldson Smith.

Geographic range
H. smithi is found in eastern Ethiopia and northern Somalia.

Habitat

Reproduction
H. smithi is oviparous.

References

Further reading
Boulenger GA (1895). "An Account of the Reptiles and Batrachians collected by Dr. A. Donaldson Smith in Western Somali-land and the Galla Country". Proceedings of the Zoological Society of London 1895: 530–540 + Plates XXIX & XXX. (Hemidactylus smithi, new species, p. 532 + Plate XXIX, Figures 2, 2a).
Largen M, Spawls S (2010). The Amphibians and Reptiles of Ethiopia and Eritrea. Frankfurt am Main, Germany: Chimaira / Serpents Tale. 694 pp. (Hemidactylus smithi, p. 312).
Loveridge A (1947). "Revision of the African Lizards of the Family Gekkonidae". Bulletin of the Museum of Comparative Zoölogy at Harvard College 98: 1–469. (Hemidactylus smithi, pp. 166–167).
Mazuch T (2013). Amphibians and Reptiles of Somaliland and Eastern Ethiopia. Dřiteč, Czech Republic: Tomáš Mazuch Publishing. 80 pp. .
Rösler H (2000). "Kommentierte Liste der rezent, subrezent und fossil bekannten Geckotaxa (Reptilia: Gekkonomorpha)". Gekkota 2: 28–153. (Hemidactylus smithi, p. 87). (in German).
Šmíd J, Carranza S, Kratochvíl L, Gvoždík V, Nasher AK, Moravec J (2013). "Out of Arabia: A Complex Biogeographic History of Multiple Vicariance and Dispersal Events in the Gecko Genus Hemidactylus (Reptilia: Gekkonidae)". PLoS One 8 (5): e64018.

Hemidactylus
Reptiles of Ethiopia
Reptiles of Somalia
Reptiles described in 1895
Taxa named by George Albert Boulenger